In enzymology, a fatty-acyl-CoA-transporting ATPase is an enzyme that catalyzes the chemical reaction

ATP + H2O + fatty acyl CoAcis  ADP + phosphate + fatty acyl CoAtrans

The 3 substrates of this enzyme are ATP, H2O, and fatty acyl CoAcis, whereas its 3 products are ADP, phosphate, and fatty acyl CoAtrans.

This enzyme belongs to the family of hydrolases, specifically those acting on acid anhydrides to catalyse transmembrane movement of substances. The systematic name of this enzyme class is ATP phosphohydrolase (fatty-acyl-CoA-transporting).

References

 
 
 

EC 7.6.2
Enzymes of unknown structure